Nisku is a hamlet and an industrial/business park in Alberta, Canada within Leduc County.

The hamlet and industrial/business park are located in census division No. 11 and in the federal riding of Edmonton—Wetaskiwin.

The Hamlet of Nisku is located east of the intersection of Queen Elizabeth II Highway (Highway 2) and Highway 625, between the cities of Edmonton and Leduc.  More specifically, the hamlet is located within an industrial/business park on the north side of Highway 625 (20 Avenue) between Sparrow Drive and the Canadian Pacific Railway.

Nisku Industrial Park 

The Nisku Industrial Park or the Nisku Business Park, according to Leduc County and the Nisku Business Association respectively, surrounds the hamlet. The park stretches from Edmonton's southern city limits to Leduc's northern city limits on the east side of the Queen Elizabeth II Highway.  It is bisected by Highway 625 (20 Avenue), which becomes Highway 19 west of the Queen Elizabeth II Highway.  The southern half of the park is located opposite the Edmonton International Airport.

Established in 1972, by the Sparrow family (brothers Bert, Jim, Murrey and Don Sparrow), the Nisku Industrial Park has emerged as an important service centre for the Edmonton Metropolitan Region and has become one of the largest industrial/business parks in Western Canada. Leduc County does not levy a business tax in the park. It has been described as "as large as all of downtown Toronto from the waterfront to Forest Hill".

Demographics 
The population of Nisku according to the 2005 municipal census conducted by Leduc County is 30.

See also 
List of communities in Alberta
List of hamlets in Alberta

References 

Hamlets in Alberta
Leduc County